Patsapong Amsam-ang (born 2 October 1997) is a Thai athlete specialising in the pole vault. He won a bronze medal at the 2018 Asian Games.

His personal bests in the event are 5.61 metres outdoors (Bangkok 2021) and 5.35 metres indoors (Astana 2023). Both are currents national records.

International competitions

References

1997 births
Living people
Patsapong Amsam-ang
Athletes (track and field) at the 2018 Asian Games
Asian Games medalists in athletics (track and field)
Patsapong Amsam-ang
Medalists at the 2018 Asian Games
Patsapong Amsam-ang
Patsapong Amsam-ang